Philip Edward Randolph Elder was an Anglican bishop in the 20th century.  He was born in 1921, educated at  Codrington College, Barbados and  ordained in 1951. His first post was as a Curate at St George's Cathedral Guyana. Later he held incumbencies in Suddie and Plaisance. After this he was Suffragan Bishop of Stabroek and then Bishop of the Windward Islands. He died on 16 March 2010.

Notes

Alumni of Codrington College
20th-century Anglican bishops in the Caribbean
Anglican bishops of the Windward Islands
1921 births
2010 deaths
Suffragan Bishops of Stabroek